Roulstone is a surname. Notable people with the surname include:

Alexander Roulstone (1890–1965), British World War I flying ace
Doug Roulstone, United States Navy officer and politician
Frank Roulstone, English footballer
George Roulstone (1767–1804), founder of The Knoxville Gazette
Walter Roulstone (1866–1953), English footballer